Truckee Meadows Water Authority (TMWA) is a public authority providing water services in the Truckee Meadows of Washoe County in Northern Nevada, which serves more than 330,000 residents. The Authority is governed by a seven-member Board of Directors, appointed by the cities of Reno and Sparks and Washoe County.

The staff is led by a General Manager. The Authority provides a wide range of water services to households and businesses within its service area, ranging from potable water residential service, to irrigation, non-potable water and fire protection services.  

The Authority is a party to the Truckee River Operating Agreement, an interstate agreement governing the use of water resources from the Truckee River.

Member agencies
 TMWA Director and Reno City Council Member Jenny Brekhus (Democratic)
 TMWA Director and Sparks City Council Member Kristopher Dahir (Republican)
 TMWA Director and Reno City Council Member Naomi Duerr (Democratic)
 TMWA Chairman and Washoe County Commissioner Vaughn Hartung (Republican)
 TMWA Director and Reno City Council Member Neoma Jardon (Republican)
 TMWA Director and Washoe County Commissioner Jeanne Herman (Republican)
 TMWA Vice Chairman Paul Anderson (Republican)

See also
 Donner Lake

References

External links
 Truckee Meadows Water Authority website 
 Yelp reviews

Water management authorities in the United States
Reno, Nevada
Sparks, Nevada 
Water in Nevada
Public benefit corporations based in the United States
Washoe County, Nevada
2000 establishments in Nevada
American companies established in 2000
Government agencies established in 2000